My Mind may refer to:

 "My Mind", a 2007 song by Portugal. The Man from the album, Church Mouth
 "My Mind", a 2017 song by Yebba
 "My Mind", a 2021 song by Baker Boy featuring G Flip from the album, Gela

See also
 In My Mind (disambiguation)
 On My Mind (disambiguation)
 "Piece of My Mind", a 2021 song by Broods
 "Where Is My Mind?", a 1988 song by Pixies